Eshkanan District is a district (bakhsh) in Lamerd County, Fars Province, Iran. At the 2006 census, its population was 18,685, in 3,905 families.  The District has two cities: Eshkanan and Ahel. The District has two rural districts (dehestan): Eshkanan Rural District and Kal Rural District.

References 

Lamerd County
Districts of Fars Province